Kashipur Michael Madhusudhan Mahavidyalaya is a general degree college in Purulia district. It offers undergraduate courses in arts. It is affiliated to Sidho Kanho Birsha University.

Accreditation
The college is recognized by the University Grants Commission (UGC).

See also

References

External links
Kashipur Michael Madhusudhan Mahavidyalaya
Sidho Kanho Birsha University
University Grants Commission
National Assessment and Accreditation Council

Colleges affiliated to Sidho Kanho Birsha University
Academic institutions formerly affiliated with the University of Burdwan
Universities and colleges in Purulia district
2000 establishments in West Bengal
Educational institutions established in 2000